Eupithecia stertzi is a moth in the family Geometridae. It is found on the Canary Islands.

The wingspan is about 18–19 mm.

References

Moths described in 1911
stertzi
Moths of Africa